The Roc is a mountain of the Gran Paradiso massif, in the Graian Alps in Italy. It is located between the Aosta Valley and Piedmont regions and is the highest point in the Metropolitan City of Turin.

Geography 
The Roc from the ridge in the section between Colle della Becca di Moncorvé (3,875 m) and the homonymous window (3,998 m), the culmination of the Orco - Dora watershed from where the long Valsavarenche-Val di Cogne ridge begins towards the north, including the summit of the Gran Paradiso (4,061 m) and other important peaks of the group, ending with the Grivola (3,969 m)

See also

List of 4000 metre peaks of the Alps

References

Alpine four-thousanders
Mountains of Aosta Valley
Mountains of Piedmont
Mountains of the Graian Alps